Abu ol Hasanabad (also Romanized as Abū ol Ḩasanābād) is a village in Harazpey-ye Shomali Rural District, Sorkhrud District, Mahmudabad County, Mazandaran Province, Iran. At the 2006 census, its population was 262, in 74 families.

References 

Populated places in Mahmudabad County